Ida of Boulogne (c. 1160–1216) was suo jure Countess of Boulogne from 1173 until her death.

Life
Ida was the elder daughter of Matthew of Alsace and Marie I, Countess of Boulogne. Her maternal grandparents were King Stephen of England and Matilda I of Boulogne. Her mother, a nun, had been abducted from a convent and forced into marriage by Matthew. As a consequence, her parents' marriage was controversial and, in 1170, was annulled.

Reign
Her father continued to rule until his death in 1173, when she succeeded. Upon the advice of her uncle, Philip I, Count of Flanders, she married first in 1181, to Gerard of Guelders, but he died in the same year. She next married Berthold IV, Duke of Zähringen, but he died in 1186.

Ida was abducted in 1190 by Count Renaud de Dammartin, who carried her off to Lorraine. She and Renaud had a daughter, Matilda II of Boulogne (died 1258).

References

Sources

1160s births
Year of birth uncertain
1216 deaths
Counts of Boulogne
Place of birth missing
Place of death missing
Ida
Ida
Ida
Ida
12th-century women rulers
13th-century women rulers
12th-century French people
12th-century French women
13th-century French people
13th-century French women